Nikora is a village in Bharuch district in the state of Gujarat in India.

References

Villages in Bharuch district